Robert Sanders (July 2, 1906 – December 26, 1974) was an American composer. His work was part of the music event in the art competition at the 1936 Summer Olympics.

References

1906 births
1974 deaths
American male composers
Olympic competitors in art competitions
People from Chicago
20th-century American male musicians